"Treasure of Love" is a song by George Jones.  It was released as a single on Mercury Records and reached No. 6 on the US country chart in 1958.

Background
Jones composed "Treasure of Love" with J. P. Richardson, better known as the Big Bopper, who also wrote Jones' first No. 1 country hit "White Lightning."  Jones biographer Bob Allen describes Jones' "languid, drawling" singing as "more reminiscent of the diphthong-twisting style of Oklahoma honky-tonk king Hank Thompson than anything he'd ever recorded." The single's B-side, "If I Don't Love You (Grits Ain't Groceries)," became a minor hit, peaking at No. 29 on the charts.

Discography

References

1958 singles
George Jones songs
Songs written by George Jones
Songs written by the Big Bopper
Mercury Records singles
1958 songs
Song recordings produced by Pappy Daily